In statistical mechanics, the  n-vector model or O(n) model is a simple system of interacting spins on a crystalline lattice.  It was developed by H. Eugene Stanley as a generalization of the Ising model, XY model and Heisenberg model.  In the n-vector model, n-component unit-length classical spins  are placed on the vertices of a d-dimensional lattice.  The Hamiltonian of the n-vector model is given by:

where the sum runs over all pairs of neighboring spins  and  denotes the standard Euclidean inner product. Special cases of the n-vector model are:

: The self-avoiding walk
: The Ising model
: The XY model
: The Heisenberg model
: Toy model for the Higgs sector of the Standard Model

The general mathematical formalism used to describe and solve the n-vector model and certain generalizations are developed in the article on the Potts model.

Continuum limit
The continuum limit can be understood to be the sigma model.  This can be easily obtained by writing the Hamiltonian in terms of the product 

where  is the "bulk magnetization" term. Dropping this term as an overall constant factor added to the energy, the limit is obtained by defining the Newton finite difference as 
 

on neighboring lattice locations  Then  in the limit , where  is the gradient in the  direction. Thus, in the limit,

which can be recognized as the kinetic energy of the field  in the sigma model. One still has two possibilities for the spin : it is either taken from a discrete set of spins (the Potts model) or it is taken as a point on the sphere ; that is,  is a continuously-valued vector of unit length.

References

Lattice models